Alexandru Moșanu (19 July 1932 – 7 December 2017) was a Moldovan politician, historian and professor.

Biography
Alexandru Moșanu was born in Braniște, Kingdom of Romania (now in Rîșcani District, Moldova). He was the first speaker of the Parliament of the Republic of Moldova between 1990 and 1993. He was also one of the co-authors of Moldova's 1991 Declaration of Independence.

Moșanu was the author of over 100 works on the history of Moldova and Romania. His most important contribution as an author is a study on Romanian historiography published in Moscow in 1988. In 1993, he became a foreign honorary member of the Romanian Academy. Between 2002 and 2005 Moșanu was the Honorary Chairman of the Social Liberal Party.

He was a leader of the Democratic Forum of Romanians in Moldova.

Awards
 Romanian Cultural Institute Prize

Works 
 Mișcări sociale și politice din România în epoca modernă
 Istoriografia românească
 Unitatea poporului român și Mișcarea de Renaștere și de Eliberare Națională a românilor basarabeni
 Alexandru Moșanu, Destin Românesc, Chișinău, 1994;
 Alexandru Moșanu, Un pilon de granit al Rezistenţei basarabene în Literatura și Arta, 17 iulie 2003.

External links 
 Interviu cu Alexandru Moşanu
 Yalta - Rubbing Salt in Romania’s Historical Wounds
 Ştire despre retragerea lui A.Moşanu din funcţia de preşedinte de onoare al PSL

1932 births
2017 deaths
Romanian people of Moldovan descent
People from Rîșcani District
Honorary members of the Romanian Academy
20th-century Romanian historians
21st-century Romanian historians
20th-century Moldovan historians
Presidents of the Moldovan Parliament
Moldovan MPs 1990–1994
Moldovan MPs 1994–1998
Moldova State University alumni
Popular Front of Moldova MPs
Liberal Democratic Party of Moldova politicians
Members of the Commission for the Study of the Communist Dictatorship in Moldova
Deaths from cancer in Romania